JS Haruyuki (DD-128) was a Hatsuyuki-class destroyer of the Japanese Maritime Self-Defense Force.

Development and design 

Adopting Japan's first all-gas turbine engine (COGOG), equipped with well-balanced weapons such as helicopters, C4I systems, and various missiles, it is inferior to Western frigate at that time. It has been evaluated as a non-escort ship. Twelve ships were built as first-generation general-purpose escort vessels in the era of eight ships and eight aircraft, they supported the escort fleet for a long time, but now they are gradually retiring due to aging.

In addition, there are many changes to training ships, and up to three ships have been operated in the training fleet as Shimayuki-class training ships, but the decline has begun with the conversion of Hatakaze-class destroyers to training ships.

The core of the combat system is the OYQ-5 Tactical Data Processing System (TDPS), composed of one AN/UYK-20 computer and five OJ-194B workstations and capable of receiving data automatically from other ships via Link-14 (STANAG 5514).

This is the first destroyer class in the JMSDF equipped with the Sea Sparrow Improved basic point defense missile system. The IBPDMS of this class uses FCS-2 fire-control systems of Japanese make and one octuple launcher at the afterdeck. And in the JMSDF, OTO Melara 76 mm compact gun and Boeing Harpoon surface-to-surface missile are adopted from the ship of FY1977 including this class. Also, ships built in FY1979 and beyond carried Phalanx CIWS and were retrofitted to previous ships.

Construction and career 
She was laid down on 11 March 1982 and launched on 6 September 1983 at IHI Corporation in Tokyo. She commissioned on 14 January 1985.

In 1986, she participated in Exercise RIMPAC 1986.

In 1988, she participated in Exercise RIMPAC 1988.

On March 26, 2008, due to a major reorganization of the Self-Defense Fleet, the 23rd Escort Squadron was renamed to the 13th Escort Squadron and reorganized under the escort fleet.

On March 13, 2014, she was removed from the register due to the commissioning of JS Fuyuzuki. The final affiliation is the 13th escort fleet of the escort fleet, and the homeport is Sasebo.

She was dismantled at Yatsushiro Port in September 2015.

Gallery

References

1983 ships
Ships built by IHI Corporation
Hatsuyuki-class destroyers